The Evian Group at IMD is an international coalition of corporate, government and opinion leaders, committed to fostering an open, inclusive, equitable and sustainable global market economy in a rules-based multilateral framework.

History and mission

The Evian Group was founded at an international meeting of trade policy makers and policy thinkers convened at the Hotel Royal in Evian-les-Bains (on the French side of Lake Geneva) – hence the name of the Group – in April 1995.

1995 was the year the WTO was founded and corresponded to the early phases of the current era of globalisation. The participants of the meeting recognised that globalisation is not an irreversible force, that nationalism, populism and protectionism require constant vigilance, and that trade is the most fundamental driving force and barometer of globalisation.

In 1997 the founder of The Evian Group, Jean-Pierre Lehmann, joined the Faculty of IMD as professor of International Political Economy. Though The Evian Group remains a separate legal entity, its close integration with IMD resulted in it adopting the name The Evian Group at IMD.

Activities

The Evian Group activities are aimed at:

• Confidence building and knowledge creation among its members, stakeholders and
constituents;

• Establishing vision and direction by formulating agendas for action;
• Enhancing global business leadership and business statesmanship;
• Influencing policy makers;
• Diffusing Evian Group ideas and intellectual capital as widely as possible;
• Preparing the next generation of industry, government and opinion leaders throughout
the world for the challenges and tasks they will need to face.

To achieve these goals, The Evian Group activities are based on three key pillars:

1) Forum for dialogue

Open dialogue, the exchange of ideas and aspirations, and an agenda for action are facilitated and promoted through The Evian Group plenary meetings and roundtables, regularly and quite frequently convened in Europe, the Arab Region, South Asia and Greater China, and occasionally in Sub-Saharan Africa and both North and South America.

The Evian Group at IMD holds high level meetings, composed of policy makers, international business decision makers and opinion leaders from all continents, with a strong emphasis on the global South. The themes mirror the critical challenges of the international economic community. Participation in The Evian Group meetings is by personal invitation only. Discussions take place according to the Chatham House Rule. Summaries and reports are published and circulated.

Open dialogue is also fostered through the Open World Initiative (OWI) - a movement for the next generation of leaders, with meetings having been held in Switzerland, Slovenia, Turkey, South Africa, Argentina and Egypt and through an active online forum, OWIFOR.

2) Think tank

The Evian Group's Brains Trust and practitioners drawn from industry, academe, think tanks, international organisations, NGOs and the media, from both industrialised and developing countries, and from different generations, throughout the world contribute in compiling policy briefs, reports, and position papers, and especially in building the intellectual capital and in formulating The Evian Group agenda.

The Evian Group also has a network of think tanks in both North and South with which it regularly cooperates.

As a Think Tank The Evian Group at IMD influences and informs policy makers on the global economic agenda and seeks to provide them with intellectual “ammunition” in support of open and inclusive trade and investment policies. This is done by inviting policy makers to The Evian Group forums, by direct correspondence, by participating in campaigns, and by active publishing in the global media: in recent years, The Evian Group articles have appeared in English, Arabic, French, Italian, Portuguese, Spanish, Czech, Russian, Chinese, Korean, Japanese and German.

3) Education

The Evian Group undertakes educational programmes at IMD, but also in other educational institutions worldwide, on the key issues emanating from The Evian Group mission and main areas of concern, focusing on the multiple challenges of globalisation and linking trade to inclusive growth, to climate change and to global governance. The Evian Group at IMD has been an active member of the Garnet (Global Governance, Regionalisation and Regulation: the Role of the EU) Network of excellence, part of the EU Sixth Framework Programme, composed of leading-edge European institutions.

The Open World Initiative

The Open World Initiative (OWI) is a network and movement of young professionals from diverse constituencies, continents and cultures who are committed to an open world economy, sustainable economic growth and human development.

OWI supports open societies, greater integration and responsible governance on the global, national and corporate and institutional levels as indispensable to achieving these goals. The OWI network aims to generate awareness of development issues and the multilateral system, serve as a forum for dialogue by and for the next generation of leaders, and keep a dialogue with decision-makers at international, national and corporate levels.

The principles OWI stands to defend are:
• Transparent and responsible global governance on a global, national, corporate, financial and individual level;
• Sustainable economic growth generated by open markets in a manner protective of societies, natural resources and the environment;
• The primary role of the private sector in promoting growth under ethical and socially responsible codes;
• Investment in human development, the empowerment of women and youth, and the enhancement of individual freedoms;
• An open world economy that creates a fairer and more tolerant open society, one that promotes cross cultural and intellectual fertilisation.

The OWI community has developed OWIFOR, an online network discussion forum that strengthens the sense of an interlinked global community in addressing and debating contemporary problems and discontinuities.

References

International Institute for Management Development (IMD)

International economic organizations